I'm All Right Jack is a 1959 British comedy film directed and produced by John and Roy Boulting from a script by Frank Harvey, John Boulting and Alan Hackney based on the 1958 novel Private Life by Alan Hackney.

The film is a sequel to the Boultings' 1956 film Private's Progress and Ian Carmichael, Dennis Price, Richard Attenborough, Terry-Thomas and Miles Malleson reprise their characters. Peter Sellers played one of his best remembered roles as the trades union shop steward Fred Kite, and won a BAFTA Best Actor Award. The rest of the cast included many well-known British comedy actors of the time.

The film is a satire on British industrial life in the 1950s. The title is a well-known English expression indicating smug and complacent selfishness. The trade unions, workers and bosses are all seen to be incompetent or corrupt. The film is one of the satires made by the Boulting Brothers between 1956 and 1963.

Plot

Stanley Windrush chats with his father at the Sunnyglades Nudist Camp, and is persuaded to seek a job as a business executive: he interviews at the "Detto" company making washing detergent and, making a very unfavourable impression, fails to get the job. He then interviews at "Num-Yum," a factory making processed cakes. Although it tastes good the process for making the cakes is very disturbing. An excess of samples causes him to be sick into a large mixing bowl of the product. Again he fails to get the job. The recruitment agent tells Windrush by letter that after getting 11 interviews in 10 days and making a singularly unimpressive impression that industry isn't for him.

His uncle, Bertram Tracepurcel and his old army comrade, Sidney DeVere Cox, persuade Windrush to take an unskilled blue-collar job at Tracepurcel's missile factory, Missiles Ltd. At first suspicious of Windrush as an over-eager newcomer, communist shop steward Fred Kite asks that Stanley be sacked for not having a union card. However, after a period of work-to-rule, he takes Stanley under his wing and even offers to take him in as a lodger. When Kite's daughter Cynthia drops by, Stanley readily accepts.

Meanwhile, personnel manager Major Hitchcock is assigned a time and motion study expert, Waters, to measure how efficient the employees are. The workers refuse to cooperate but Waters tricks Windrush into showing him how much more quickly he can do his job with his forklift truck than other more experienced employees. When Kite is informed of the results, he calls a strike to protect the rates his union workers are being paid. This is what Cox and Tracepurcel want: Cox owns a company that can take over a large new contract with a Middle Eastern country at an inflated cost. He, Tracepurcel and a Mr Mohammed, the country's representative, would each pocket a third of the £100,000 difference (£ million today). The excuse to the foreign government is that a faster contract costs more.

The union meet and decide to punish Windrush by "sending him to Coventry" and he is informed of this in writing. Stanley's rich aunt visits the Kite household where she is met by Mrs Kite with some sympathy.

Things don't work out for either side. Cox arrives at his factory, Union Jack Foundries, to find that his workers are walking out in a sympathy strike. The press reports that Kite is punishing Windrush for working hard. When Windrush decides to cross the picket line and go back to work (and reveals his connection with the company's owner), Kite asks him to leave his house. This provokes the adoring Cynthia and her mother to go on strike. More strikes spring up, bringing the country to a standstill.

Faced with these new developments, Tracepurcel has no choice but to send Hitchcock to negotiate with Kite. They reach an agreement but Windrush has made both sides look bad and has to go.

Cox tries to bribe Windrush with a bagful of money to resign but Windrush turns him down. On a televised discussion programme ("Argument") hosted by Malcolm Muggeridge, Windrush reveals to the nation the underhanded motivations of all concerned. When he throws Cox's bribe money into the air, the studio audience riots.

In the end, Windrush is accused of causing a disturbance and bound over to keep the peace for 12 months. He is last seen with his father relaxing at a nudist colony, only to have to flee from the female residents' attentions. Unlike in the opening scene, this time he is naked.

Cast

 Ian Carmichael as Stanley Windrush
 Peter Sellers as Fred Kite
 Terry-Thomas as Major Hitchcock
 Richard Attenborough as Sydney DeVere Cox
 Dennis Price as Bertram Tracepurcel
 Margaret Rutherford as Aunt Dolly
 Irene Handl as Mrs Kite
 Liz Fraser as Cynthia Kite, Fred's daughter
 Miles Malleson as Stanley Windrush's father
 Marne Maitland as Mr Mohammed
 John Le Mesurier as Waters
 Raymond Huntley as Magistrate
 Victor Maddern as Knowles
 Kenneth Griffith as Dai
 Fred Griffiths as Charlie
 John Comer as Shop Steward
 Sam Kydd as Shop Steward
 Cardew Robinson as Shop Steward
 Ronnie Stevens as Hooper
 Martin Boddey as Num Yum's Executive
 Brian Oulton as Appointments Board Examiner
 John Glyn-Jones as Detto Executive
 Terry Scott as Crawley
 Alun Owen as Film Producer
 Eynon Evans as Truscott
 John Van Eyssen as Reporter
 David Lodge as Card Player
 Keith Smith as Card Player
 Bob Grant as Card Player
 Clifford Keedy as Card Player
 Tony Comer as Shop Steward
 Wally Patch as Worker
 Esma Cannon as Spencer
 E. V. H. Emmett as Narrator
 Stringer Davis as Journalist 
 Peter Sellers as Sir John Kennaway

Cast notes
 Malcolm Muggeridge, B.B.C. announcer Frank Phillips and television announcer Muriel Young appear as themselves.

Release and reception
I’m All Right Jack opened at the Leicester Square Theatre in London on 13 August 1959.

The film was a big hit, being the most popular film in Britain for the year ended 31 October 1959. It was reportedly the second most profitable British movie that year after Carry On Nurse and helped  British Lion enter profitability for the year after two years of losses. As well as Sellers' BAFTA, it also won the BAFTA Award for Best British Screenplay.

Bosley Crowther in The New York Times called it "the brightest, liveliest comedy seen this year."

On Rotten Tomatoes the film has an approval rating of 88% based on reviews from 8 critics.

See also
 English-language accents in film – Cockney
 Larsen, Darl. A Book about the Film Monty Python's Life of Brian. Lanham, MD: Rowman & Littlefield, 2018. . The PFJ/Peoples' Front for Judea is modelled on Shop Steward Kite's committee.
 BFI Top 100 British films

References

External links
 
 
 
 
 
 

1959 films
1959 comedy films
1950s satirical films
British black-and-white films
British comedy films
British satirical films
1950s English-language films
Films scored by Ron Goodwin
Films about the labor movement
Films based on British novels
Films directed by John Boulting
Films set in England
1950s British films